Cobden is a village in Union County, Illinois, United States, within the Southern Illinois region informally known as "Little Egypt.” The population as of the 2020 census  is 1,034, a decline of 10.63% since the 2010 census. Cobden is regionally known for the mascot of its public school district, Cobden Unit School District #17, called the "Appleknockers,” which has been voted as one of the most unique high school mascots in the country by numerous publications.
The area around Cobden is widely known for its many wineries and orchards, most notably Flamm Orchards, which is just north of town, and Rendleman Orchard in nearby Alto Pass, Illinois.

History
The village is named after British politician Richard Cobden, who visited the town in 1859. An early variant name was "South Pass".
Cobden began as an agricultural town and developed around the tracks of a route owned by the Illinois Central Railroad (now owned by Canadian National Railway), as well as being along a main highway, U.S. Highway 51, running through the region.

Geography
Cobden is located at  (37.533949, -89.255409).
Cobden lies 13.7 miles south of Carbondale, Illinois and just north of the towns of Anna, Illinois and Jonesboro, Illinois, along Old U.S Highway 51, which runs straight through town. Nearby Alto Pass, Illinois lies 5.1 miles to the northwest. 

Cobden is located near the crest of the Shawnee Hills. It is in "Cobden Col", a valley cut into rock by water near the summit of this ancient mountain range. Approximately 100,000 years ago, the Illinoian ice sheet covered almost all of Illinois. As it pushed south, the ice sheet climbed the Shawnee Mountains. The height of the ice sheet was much greater than that of the mountains. It stopped before it reached their summits. As it melted, a lake formed between the mountains and the glacier. Cobden Col was the outlet of this lake.

Mascot
Cobden's claim to fame is its unique mascot, an Appleknocker, or a man with freckles wearing a straw hat and chewing on a piece of straw.  This nickname originated when the high school first began to compete in athletics. It did not yet have a mascot, so other schools made up this derogatory term to insult the new school because of their large industry in peach and apple orchards.  However, when Cobden High School played for and lost the state basketball championship in 1964, this name was cemented in the town's history and became part of its cultural identity.

Demographics

As of the census of 2000, there were 1,116 people, 421 households, and 276 families residing in the village. The racial makeup of the village was 48.8% White, 1.43% African American, 0.63% Native American, 5.73% from other races, and 1.52% from two or more races. Hispanic or Latino of any race were 51.3% of the population.

There were 421 households, out of which 30.6% had children under the age of 18 living with them, 49.9% were married couples living together, 12.1% had a female householder with no husband present, and 34.4% were non-traditional families. 30.6% of all households were made up of individuals, and 14.5% had someone living alone who was 65 years of age or older. The average household size was 2.47 and the average family size was 3.16.

In the village, the population was spread out, with 25.2% under the age of 18, 8.0% from 18 to 24, 23.8% from 25 to 44, 25.1% from 45 to 64, and 17.9% who were 65 years of age or older. The median age was 40 years. For every 100 females, there were 83.9 males. For every 100 females age 18 and over, there were 83.1 males.

The median income for a household in the village was $26,364, and the median income for a family was $32,500. Males had a median income of $25,938 versus $19,423 for females. The per capita income for the village was $13,978. About 13.7% of families and 22.1% of the population were below the poverty line, including 21.5% of those under age 18 and 14.7% of those age 65 or over.

Notable people
 Mary Tracy Earle (1864-1955), author
 Thomas Oscar Freeman (1947-1982), murderer and murder victim

References

Sources
"History of Cobden," History Committee of the Cobden Community Development Program, 1955

Villages in Union County, Illinois
Villages in Illinois
Mexican-American history